Jerónimo Barrales  (born 28 January 1987) is an Argentine professional footballer who plays as a forward for Super League Greece club Asteras Tripolis.

Club career
Barrales was born in Adrogué, Buenos Aires Province. After playing rugby in his late infancy he joined Club Atlético Banfield's youth system at the age of 12, and made his professional debut in 2006, going on to establish as a key member of the first team; during the 2007–08 season, the Apertura and Clausura tournaments combined, he scored eight goals in 32 games as they ranked third in the former.

On 3 July 2009, Spanish Segunda División club Recreativo de Huelva signed Barrales on loan. At the end of the season he returned to Banfield, where he failed to reproduce his previous form, leaving for Santiago Wanderers of Chile on loan in early January 2011. The following year, he returned to his homeland and joined Primera Nacional side Club Atlético Huracán.

On 5 July 2013, Barrales signed with Asteras Tripolis F.C. for an undisclosed fee. He made his Super League Greece debut on 18 August, playing the full 90 minutes in a 3–3 home draw with PAS Giannina FC.

Barrales was linked to Standard Liège in April 2015, after solid performances that eventually led him to be crowned league top scorer in the 2014–15 campaign with 17 goals, helping his team finish fourth. In addition, he scored three times in the group stage of the UEFA Europa League, twice against Tottenham Hotspur.

On 18 August 2015, Barrales joined Turkish club Sivasspor after agreeing to a three-year contract for €1.5 million. Grossly unsettled in the country, he then returned to Huracán on loan.

Barrales signed for Johor Darul Ta'zim F.C. of the Malaysia Super League on 7 January 2017, but after several poor performances he was controversially sent to the feeder team outside the transfer window, with countryman Gabriel Guerra moving in opposite direction to help his team win the double.

Barrales returned to the Greek top division in July 2018, signing with PAS Lamia 1964 from Club de Gimnasia y Esgrima La Plata. He scored his first goal for the club on 7 October in a 1–1 home draw with OFI Crete FC, adding a further two in the next two matches, against Athlitiki Enosi Larissa FC (2–1 away win) and Levadiakos FC (3–2 victory, home).

On 9 August 2019, Barrales returned to former side Asteras for an undisclosed fee. He scored 11 goals in 26 games in the first season in his second spell to help to a mid-table finish, before agreeing to a one-year extension on 20 July 2020.

Honours
Individual
Super League Greece Top goalscorer: 2014–15 (17 goals)
Super League Greece Team of the Year: 2014–15
Asteras Tripolis Player of the Year: 2019–20, 2020–21

References

External links

1987 births
Living people
People from Adrogué
Sportspeople from Buenos Aires Province
Argentine footballers
Association football forwards
Argentine Primera División players
Primera Nacional players
Club Atlético Banfield footballers
Unión de Santa Fe footballers
Club Atlético Huracán footballers
Club de Gimnasia y Esgrima La Plata footballers
Segunda División players
Recreativo de Huelva players
Chilean Primera División players
Santiago Wanderers footballers
Super League Greece players
Asteras Tripolis F.C. players
PAS Lamia 1964 players
Süper Lig players
Sivasspor footballers
Malaysia Super League players
Johor Darul Ta'zim F.C. players
Argentine expatriate footballers
Expatriate footballers in Spain
Expatriate footballers in Chile
Expatriate footballers in Greece
Expatriate footballers in Turkey
Expatriate footballers in Malaysia
Argentine expatriate sportspeople in Spain
Argentine expatriate sportspeople in Chile
Argentine expatriate sportspeople in Greece
Argentine expatriate sportspeople in Turkey
Argentine expatriate sportspeople in Malaysia